Bulbophyllum annandalei or Annandale's Bulbophyllum is a species of orchid in the genus Bulbophyllum in section Cirrhopetalum. 

It is found in peninsular Thailand and Malaysia at elevations of around 1000 meters above sea level.

Description
Bulbophyllum annandalei has conical pseudobulbs that each carry a single apical succulent leaf.

As with many other species the plant blooms on a flower spike that grows from the base of a pseudobulb. Each flowers spike holds between 2 and 4 small yellow flowers.

References
The Bulbophyllum-Checklist
 The Internet Orchid Species Photo Encyclopedia: Bulbophyllum annandalei

annandalei